Watertown Historic District or Watertown Commercial Historic District may refer to:

in the United States
(by state)
Watertown Center Historic District, Watertown, CT, listed on the NRHP in Connecticut
Watertown Arsenal Historic District, Watertown, MA, listed on the NRHP in Massachusetts
Watertown Historic District (Watertown, Ohio), listed on the NRHP in Ohio
Watertown Commercial Historic District (Jefferson, South Dakota), listed on the NRHP in South Dakota
Watertown Commercial Historic District (Watertown, Tennessee), listed on the NRHP in Tennessee

See also
Watertown (disambiguation)